The men's cycling team pursuit at the 2012 Olympic Games in London took place at the London Velopark on 2 and 3 August.

The gold medal was won in world record-breaking time by Great Britain's team consisting of Ed Clancy, Geraint Thomas, Steven Burke and Peter Kennaugh. Australia took the silver medal and New Zealand won bronze.

Competition format

The men's team pursuit race consists of a 4 km race between two teams of four cyclists, starting on opposite sides of the track. If one team catches the other, the race is over.

The tournament started with an initial qualifying round. The top four teams in the qualifying round remained in contention for the gold medal, the 5th to 8th-place teams could compete for a possible bronze, and the remaining teams were eliminated.

The "first round" consisted of the four fastest qualifiers competing in head-to-head races (1st vs. 4th, 2nd vs. 3rd).  The winners of these heats advanced to the gold medal final.  The other four qualifiers also competed in the first round (5th vs. 8th and 6th vs. 7th).  Advancement to the bronze medal final was based solely on time, with the fastest two teams among the six qualifiers who had not advanced to the gold medal final reaching the bronze medal final.  Qualification races were also held to determine 5th and 6th place (between the next two fastest first-round teams who had not reached either the gold or bronze finals) and 7th/8th place (among the remaining two first-round teams).

Schedule 
All times are British Summer Time

Results

Qualification

First round

Finals

Final 7th-8th place

Final 5th-6th place

Final bronze medal

Final gold medal

References

Track cycling at the 2012 Summer Olympics
Cycling at the Summer Olympics – Men's team pursuit
Men's events at the 2012 Summer Olympics